Edgardo Toetti (10 July 1910 – 2 June 1968) was an Italian athlete who competed mainly in the 100 metres.

Biography
He competed for an Italy in the 1932 Summer Olympics held in Los Angeles, California, in the 4 x 100 metre relay where he won the bronze medal with his teammates Giuseppe Castelli, Ruggero Maregatti and Gabriele Salviati.

Olympic results

National titles
Edgardo Toetti has won nine time the individual national championship.
 6 wins on 100 metres (1928, 1929, 1930, 1931, 1932, 1934)
 3 wins on 200 metres (1928, 1932, 1934)

See also
 Italy national relay team
 100 metres winners of Italian Athletics Championships

References

External links
 
 

1910 births
1968 deaths
Athletes from Milan
Athletes (track and field) at the 1928 Summer Olympics
Athletes (track and field) at the 1932 Summer Olympics
Italian male sprinters
Olympic athletes of Italy
Olympic bronze medalists for Italy
Olympic bronze medalists in athletics (track and field)
Medalists at the 1932 Summer Olympics
Italian Athletics Championships winners